Dichomeris hamulifera is a moth in the family Gelechiidae. It was described by Hou-Hun Li, Hui Zhen and Roger C. Kendrick in 2010. It is found in Hong Kong in China.

The wingspan is 15–16 mm. The hindwings are dark brown.

Etymology
The species name refers to the hooked process of uncus and is derived from Latin hamulifer (meaning with a small hook).

References

Moths described in 2010
hamulifera